The Gunga Din was an American rock band, formed in 1998 in New York City. Featuring vocalist Siobhan Duffy, guitarist/vocalist Bill Bronson, bassist Chris Pravdica, drummer Jim Sclavunos, and keyboardist Maria Zastrow, the band released two albums, Introducing: The Gunga Gin and Glitterati, in 1999 and 2000, respectively. Its members came from a diverse musical background, playing in the bands such as God Is My Co-Pilot, Swans, and Nick Cave and the Bad Seeds.

Described as a "New York-style art rock band," The Gunga Din combined a Farfisa organ and psychedelic music-inspired drumming. Its debut album was described as "an equal blend of post-punk and new wave" with occasional psychobilly influences and was compared to the works of the bands such as the Doors, X and Suicide. The band's second studio album also drew comparisons to the works of PJ Harvey and The Velvet Underground.

Band members
 Siobhan Duffy – vocals, drums
 Bill Bronson – guitar, vocals
 Chris Pravdica – bass guitar
 Jim Sclavunos – drums
 Maria Zastrow – keyboards

Discography
Studio albums
 Introducing: The Gunga Din (1999) 
 Glitterati (2000)

Other releases
 Your Glitter Never Dulls (2000)

References

External links
 

Musical groups established in 1998
Indie rock musical groups from New York (state)
American art rock groups
Musical groups from New York City
Musical quintets
Musical groups disestablished in 2000